The Air Force Life Cycle Management Center (AFLCMC), headquartered at Wright-Patterson AFB, is one of six centers reporting to the Air Force Materiel Command.
Led by a Lieutenant General, AFLCMC is charged with life cycle management of Air Force weapon systems from their inception to retirement. The AFLCMC mission is to support qualities of war-winning.

AFLCMC was designed to provide a single face and voice to customers, management of weapon systems across their life cycles, and to simplify and consolidate staff functions and processes to curtail redundancy and enhance efficiency. In addition, AFLCMC's operating structure provides a framework for decision making and process optimization across the weapon system life cycle. AFLCMC personnel work closely with their counterparts at the other four AFMC centers.

Organization 
AFLCMC's portfolio includes: Information Technology systems and networks; Command, Control, Communications, Intelligence, Surveillance and Reconnaissance systems; C3I and Networks AFPEO at Hanscom Air Force Base; Armament Directorate at Eglin Air Force Base; strategic systems; aerial platforms; and various specialized or supporting systems such as simulators or personal equipment. AFLCMC also executes sales of aircraft and other defense-related equipment while building relationships with foreign partner nation's air forces. Approximately 26,000 AFLCMC airmen, civilian and contractor employees perform center missions from some 75 locations.

Each Program Office reports to one of 10 Program Executive Officers (PEOs) who are accountable for the activities within their portfolio and who report to the Air Force Service Acquisition Executive at the Pentagon (Assistant Secretary of the Air Force for Acquisition).

AFLCMC execution directorates provide direct program support such as engineering, technical order management, developmental planning, contracting, and source selection assistance. The execution directorates include: Technical Engineering Services; Intelligence; Cost and Financial Analysis; Program Development & Integration; Contracting Execution; and Life Cycle Management and Services. The Air Force Security Assistance and Cooperation Directorate oversees execution of the foreign military sales mission. The Airborne Laser Directorate executes a technology development mission for high altitude, anti-ballistic missile, directed energy capabilities and reports to the Missile Defense Agency. A Propulsion Directorate headquartered at Tinker AFB, Okla., oversees engine acquisition executed at Wright-Patterson and engine product support accomplished at Tinker.

The 66th Air Base Group at Hanscom AFB, Mass., and the 88th Air Base Wing at Wright-Patterson AFB provide base operating support at those locations and also report to AFLCMC.

List of commanders

References

External links
Air Force Life Cycle Management Center Homepage (official)
Air Force Materiel Command Units (official)

Centers of the United States Air Force